Just a Story from America was the fourth major label album by singer-songwriter Elliott Murphy and was reviewed by Paul Nelson in Rolling Stone. The album was recorded at Air Studios in London in 1976 and featured guest artists former Rolling Stones guitarist Mick Taylor and future Genesis front man Phil Collins on drums. "Anastasia" was a minor hit in France and "Drive All Night" was a hit for the Japanese band The Roosters in 1980.

Track listing
All tracks composed by Elliott Murphy

"Drive All Night"
"Summer House"
"Just a Story from America"
"Rock Ballad"
"Think Too Hard"
"Anastasia"
"Darlin'"
"Let Go"
"Caught Short in the Long Run"

Personnel
Elliott Murphy – vocals, guitar, harmonica, organ, marimba, tambourine
Phil Collins – drums, backing vocals
Mick Taylor – guitar on "Rock Ballad"
Dave Markee – bass
Peter Oxendale – piano, organ
Morris Pert – percussion
Chris Mercer, Steve Gregory – saxophone on "Drive All Night"
Barry De Souza – drums on "Caught Short in the Long Run"
Mike Moran – keyboards on "Caught Short in the Long Run"
Technical
Colin Fairley, Greg Walsh, Steve Holroyd - recording
Paula Scher
David Bailey – photography

References

1977 albums
Elliott Murphy albums
Columbia Records albums